The Carbon Offsetting and Reduction Scheme for International Aviation (CORSIA) is a carbon offset and carbon reduction scheme to lower CO2 emissions for international flights, to curb the aviation impact on climate change.

It was developed by the International Civil Aviation Organization (ICAO) and adopted in October 2016. Its goal is to have a carbon neutral growth from 2020.
CORSIA uses Market-based environmental policy instruments to offset CO2 emissions: aircraft operators have to purchase carbon credits from the  carbon market. Starting in 2021, the scheme is voluntary for all countries until 2027.

Background

The 1997 Kyoto Protocol include CO₂ emissions from airports and domestic aviation in its first period (2008–2012), but not international aviation CO₂ emissions or climate effects beyond CO₂. From 2009, Governments agreed to work for the Kyoto Protocol to reduce and to allocate international aviation emissions through the International Civil Aviation Organization (ICAO). An agreement was not reached during the 2009 Copenhagen climate conference. Failure to reach an agreement could lead to the average global temperature rising above 2 °C, not avoiding dangerous climate change.

In 2009, the air transport industry targeted a fuel efficiency improvement of 1.5% per year until 2020; carbon-neutral growth capping CO₂ emissions from 2020; and halving its CO₂ emissions by 2050 compared to 2005. In 2010, international flights emitted  of carbon dioxide.

Adoption 

In October 2016, the 191 nations of the ICAO established the scheme, requiring operators to purchase carbon offsets to cover their emissions above 2020 levels, starting from 2021. Forestry and carbon-reducing activities will be funded by 2% of the sector annual revenues, avoiding "double counting" of existing efforts. CORSIA is voluntary until 2027, but many countries, including the US and China, promised to begin from the 2020 start. The WWF saw carbon credits as credible, but the scheme appears insufficient in the long run while review periods are included.

The agreement does not include an objective of containing global warming to 1.5-2 °C like the 2015 Paris climate agreement. As emissions below 2020 levels are grandfathered, CORSIA will regulate 25% of aviation's international emissions. CORSIA applies to international flights representing 60% of aviation emissions, and the initial voluntary period includes 65 nations, leaving out Russia, India and perhaps Brazil.

Due to the impact of the COVID-19 pandemic on aviation, the value of 2019 emissions will be used for the pilot phase of the CORSIA implementation from 2021 to 2023.

Implementation

On 15 February 2019, the ICAO announced an agreement on alternative fuels to reduce offsets, but details on how to reach the target of halving 2005-level emissions by 2050 remain elusive. 
On 18 February, the European Council urged the ICAO to implement CORSIA swiftly and to “agree on a long-term goal at its next assembly” in September.
For the Air Transport Action Group, the ICAO could take three years to negotiate, until 2022.

Fossil fuels produced from newer oil wells, or with some more efficient refinery processing will be eligible. Aviation biofuels from a variety of feedstocks including palm oil, the most likely source and a leading cause of deforestation, would be eligible for use.

Participation
As of January 2018, more than 70 countries representing more than 85% of international aviation activity have volunteered to participate. India and Russia are yet to join CORSIA. India, which has four of the five carbon-neutral airports in the Asia-Pacific region and the world's first fully solar powered airport, has drawn attention to "differentiated responsibilities" and the "need to ensure the transfer of financial resources, technology transfer and deployment and capacity building support to developing countries for enabling them to voluntarily undertake action plans.".

Exemptions
Least Developed Countries, Small Island Developing States and Landlocked Developing Countries can volunteer to participate in CORSIA, while it is not mandated on them. However, all ICAO member states "with aeroplane operators conducting international flights are required to monitor, report and verify carbon dioxide emissions from these flights every year from 2019". All aeroplane operators with  emissions less than or equal to 10,000 tonnes are exempted from the CORSIA reporting requirements.

Emissions from domestic air travel are not included in CORSIA. ICAO states that "Emissions from domestic aviation, as other domestic sources, are addressed under the UNFCCC and calculated as part of the national GHG inventories and are included in national totals (part of the Nationally Determined Contributions (NDCs))..."

Criticisms

Advocacy group and observer Transport and Environment thinks CORSIA won’t reduce demand for jet fuel, while Greenpeace called it "a timid step in the right direction."
Non-governmental organizations formed the Stay Grounded network in various countries during the 2016 ICAO conference. Fifty organisations including Attac Europe, Friends of the Earth International, Global Justice Now, Greenpeace, and the Indigenous Environmental Network, among others, signed a petition against airport expansion. One hundred organisations, including Greenpeace and Friends of the Earth, signed a civil society statement rejecting ICAO’s aviation emissions offset scheme, as it would cause global warming to surpass 1.5 °C.

CORSIA is a market based mechanism to offset emissions: an airline would purchase carbon credits to offset its emissions.
The Directorate-General for Mobility and Transport of the european commission has described it as "a delicate compromise between all involved in its elaboration."
The scheme may address a significant part of emissions from the expansion of international aviation.
Aviation related emissions are not capped.

Offsetting focuses on emissions trading rather than reducing emissions.
Forest offsets could predominate, but their effectiveness could be reduced by wildfires, droughts, pests, illegal logging and geopolitical dynamics, making it difficult to measure, verify or guarantee carbon sequestration.
Forest offset projects can result in human rights violations.
CORSIA may not be as stringent as the European Union Emission Trading Scheme.

Neste is the largest producer of biofuels from Hydrotreated Vegetable Oil, the most mature and economically viable technology for commercial aviation biofuels, and relies on crude palm oil and palm fatty acid distillate. Neste has decided to establish its aviation biofuel production in Singapore, in the largest palm oil producing region, linked to rampant deforestation.
Biofuels from palm oil could emit more CO2 than the replaced fossil fuels, and cause biodiversity loss.
CORSIA would create demand for aviation biofuel.

See also
Bunkers (energy in transport)
Carbon neutrality
Carbon offset
Environmental impact of aviation
Environmental impact of transport
Electric aircraft
Initial IMO Strategy on the reduction of GHG emissions from ships
Sustainable transport

References

External links
CORSIA
ICAO Carbon Emissions Calculator
Calculator for comparing environmental impacts of various transport options

Aviation and the environment
Bioenergy organizations
Carbon finance
Emissions trading